The J. Geils Band is the self-titled debut studio album by American rock band The J. Geils Band. The album was released on November 16, 1970, by Atlantic Records.

Critical reception

The band had once been known as the J. Geils Blues Band, but its debut album revealed the stylistic range it had long developed. In an effusive contemporary review, a journalist for rock magazine Creem praised the diversity and wrote: "It could be called blues, it could be called R&B, it could be called rock and roll; I prefer to call it good energetic music and leave it at that. They spent their formative years absorbing the best of all these musics and the sound they have distilled is truly their own."

Track listing

Juke Joint Jimmy is a pseudonym used by The J. Geils Band for group compositions.

Personnel

The J. Geils Band
 Peter Wolf – lead vocals
 J. Geils – guitar
 Magic Dick – harmonica
 Seth Justman – piano, organ
 Danny Klein – bass
 Stephen Jo Bladd – drums, backing vocals

Technical
 Dave Crawford, Brad Shapiro – producers
 Jay Messina, Geoffrey Haslam – engineers
 Stephen Paley – photography
 Lloyd Ziff – design
 Fred Lewis - special assistance

Charts

References

1970 debut albums
The J. Geils Band albums
Atlantic Records albums
Albums produced by Brad Shapiro